Ferrara di Monte Baldo is a comune (municipality) in the Province of Verona in the Italian region Veneto, located in the Valle dell'Orsa about  west of Venice and about  northwest of Verona.

The Monte Baldo is located nearby.

References

External links
 Official website

Cities and towns in Veneto